Aleksandr Shchukin may refer to:

 Aleksandr Vladimirovich Shchukin (1946–1988), Soviet test pilot and cosmonaut
 Aleksandr Yuryevich Shchukin (1969–2000), Russian professional footballer